Allouez may refer to:

People
Claude-Jean Allouez (1622-1689), Jesuit missionary and French explorer in North America

Places
Allouez, Wisconsin in Brown County
Allouez Bay, in Douglas County Wisconsin on Lake Superior 
Allouez Township, Michigan
Allouez, Michigan, an unincorporated community